St Louis Grammar School may refer to:

St Louis Grammar School, Ballymena, Northern Ireland
St Louis Grammar School, Kilkeel, Northern Ireland